Sacrificial Etchings (Selected Works 1996–2002) is a compilation album by South African gothic rock band The Awakening released 1 January 2003.

Track listing
All songs written by Ashton Nyte except The Sound of Silence written by Paul Simon
"The Dark Romantics (Single Mix)" – 4:44 
"The Sound of Silence (Splintered version)" – 4:43
"Vampyre Girl (Previously Unreleased)" – 4:07
"Eve (Wish Version)" – 4:31
"Before I Leap (Dark Mix)" – 4:39
"The March (single version)" – 4:59
"Rain" – 4:15
"Martyr" – 5:05
"Maree (version 2)" – 4:40
"To Give" – 4:03
"The Fountain" – 4:06
"Standing (Solitude Version '02)" – 4:11
"Dreams in Fire" – 4:47
"Sacrificial (Lacerated Version 2002)" – 4:47
"Amethyst (Live Piano version)" – 3:21

References

The Awakening (band) albums
2002 albums